Helichrysum melitense, the Maltese everlasting, is a species of flowering plant in the family Asteraceae and is endemic to Malta, specifically on the island of Gozo. It can be found in Dwejra, and in cliffs in Gozo near Fungus Rock. Its natural habitats are Mediterranean-type shrubby vegetation on Coastal garigue and vertical sheer cliffs. Recently, it was recorded in new locations on the island of Gozo. This species is on the decline in the wild, and it is threatened by habitat loss. It is very easy to cultivate, and it is gaining ornamental popularity amongst the locals.

Description 
This is a low shrub, ranging from 30–70 cm in height; has small lanceolate leaves that are erect; and the flower heads only contain yellow tubular florets. The flowers smell like curry, and when flowers are kept dry indoors, they can last for many years with their original colours, hence the name 'Everlasting'. The leaves have many tiny silvery hairs on their surface, and when wet they look green, but when dry they look silvery. The hairs protect the plant for the heavy winds and summer drought from drying up.

See also
Endemic Maltese wildlife
Flora of Malta

References

Sciberras, J. & Sciberras, A. (2009) Notes on the distribution of Helichrysum melitense, Hyoseris frutescens and Matthiola incana melitensis in the Maltese islands. The Central Mediterranean Naturalist 5(1):28-34. Nature Trust Malta publications.

melitense
Flora of Malta
Critically endangered plants
Endemic flora of Malta
Taxonomy articles created by Polbot
Taxa named by Sandro Pignatti
Plants described in 1988